Dunedin Hospital is the main public hospital in Dunedin, New Zealand. It serves as the major base hospital for the Otago and Southland regions with a potential catchment radius of roughly 300 kilometres, and a population of around 300,000.

Operations
Dunedin Hospital is New Zealand's largest hospital south of Christchurch. Patients are transferred or sent to this tertiary level care hospital from smaller secondary care hospitals across Otago and Southland including Dunstan Hospital in Clyde, Lakes District Hospital in Queenstown and Oamaru, Gore and Invercargill hospitals. Dunedin Hospital is the major trauma centre for the Otago region and the tertiary major trauma centre for the Otago and Southland regions.

Dunedin Hospital is operated by the Southern District Health Board, formed by the amalgamation of the Otago District Health Board and Southland District Health Board. It is located in the central business district of Dunedin close to the University of Otago, occupying the city block bounded by Great King Street, Hanover Street, Cumberland Street and Frederick Street. It is an approximately 400-bed tertiary hospital and is affiliated with the University of Otago. It has approximately 3,000 staff members.

Queen Mary Maternity Centre

Dunedin Hospital includes the Queen Mary Maternity Centre. The maternity unit directly replaced the nearby Queen Mary Hospital, which opened in 1937. Queen Mary in turn directly replaced the Batchelor Hospital, originally known as Forth Street Maternity Hospital.

Helipad

The Ward Block building has a helipad on the roof of the northeast corner . The hospital helipad improves patient care, reducing the need for ambulance transfers between a remote helipad and the hospital. Due to CAA safety requirements, only "Performance Class One" (twin-engined) helicopters are allowed to land on the hospital.

History
The original hospital was built at The Octagon in 1851, and moved to the site of the present hospital in 1865.

2007 Norovirus outbreak
In March 2007 two wards of the hospital were closed due to a suspected outbreak of norovirus, thought to have been brought in by a patient. On 16 August 2008 the hospital was put in lockdown for one week due to a norovirus outbreak affecting 73 patients and nearly 100 staff, blocking most visitors for the duration, and postponing 2,300 procedures.

COVID-19 pandemic
In early June 2022, the Dunedin Hospital was closed to visitors following an outbreak of COVID-19 within its wards.

Rebuild
During the 2017 New Zealand general election, the opposition Labour Party campaigned on commencing the rebuilding of the Dunedin Public Hospital before the 2020 New Zealand general election and completing the rebuild before the 2027 timeframe claimed by the-then National-led government. Ultimately, the Labour coalition government failed to deliver this campaign promise by 2020 and pushed back the completion date to 2029.

Parts of the hospital are significantly dated, especially the Clinical Services Block (erected 1965) which was constructed with asbestos, as was standard construction practice at the time. The Clinical Services Block has also had significant maintenance issues, such as asbestos and leaks in the roof which allowed rain water to seep into the main operating theatres during a storm. As a result of these and other issues, a significant rebuild project is underway for the reconstruction of the entire hospital, headed by Pete Hodgson, at an estimated cost of $1.2 to 1.6 billion. It is estimated to be completed by 2028.

On 4 May 2018, Health Minister David Clark announced that the Government would be building a new public hospital on the site of the former Cadbury factory site and a neighbouring block that included the building occupied by Work and Income. The construction project is estimated to cost NZ$1.4 billion, would involve around a thousand workers, and is expected to finish by 2026. Clark confirmed that the Government had purchased the former Cadbury factory site from Mondelez for an undisclosed sum. While the Government has ruled out private-public partnership, Clark has told Stuff that the Government has not ruled out Iwi investment.

In September 2022, the Otago Daily Times reported that the budgetary concerns had led the Ministry of Health to consider reducing the new hospital's capacity including reducing the number and size of beds, operating theatres, and wards. The hospital's budget had increased from NZ$1.2 billion to NZ$1.47 billion due to inflation and the rising costs of building materials. In response, National List MP Michael Woodhouse expressed outrage that the Government was considering reducing the number of beds and services. In late October 2022, a report by Te Whatu Ora Southern expressed concern that efforts to trim NZ$100 million from the hospital rebuilding budget could pose a "reputational, operational and clinical risk" to the public hospital.

In December 2022, the Otago Daily Times and Radio New Zealand confirmed that Te Whatu Ora would be reducing the number of beds and operating theatres as part of a "value management exercise" to manage a NZ$200 million budget increase in the Dunedin hospital rebuild. While the Government had earlier invested an additional NZ$110 milion in the Dunedin hospital rebuild, there was still a shortfall of NZ$90 million. In order to cover the shortfall, the number of beds would be reduced from 421 to 398 beds, the number of operating theatres would be reduced from 28 to 26, the number of MRI scanners would be reduced from three to two, and the PET-CT scanner would be delayed. In response, National Party MP Michael Woodhouse criticised the Government for delaying the hospital rebuild project and abandoning its promise not to reduce the hospital's capacity.

Though Mayor of Dunedin Jules Radich initially supported the proposed cutbacks to the Hospital and described the redesign as a "reasonable compromise," he revised his position in the face of opposition to the proposed cutbacks from the Dunedin public and fellow Dunedin councillors including David Benson-Pope, who announced plans to submit a motion calling on the Dunedin City Council (DCC) to campaign for the Hospital to be rebuilt according to its original specifications.

In 18 January 2023, the Otago Daily Times reported that a pavilion building dedicated to providing staff workspaces and other staff facilities had been eliminated frim the final design of the new hospital Te Whatu Ora had also confirmed that it would cut more than 450 non-clinical spaces. In response, the Association of Salaried Medical Specialists southern representative Kris Smith expressed concern about the proposed loss of individual workspaces on the morale and well-being of medical professionals including having to wear facemasks and working from home for non-clinical duties. In response to criticism from Mayor Radich, Health Minister Little denied that the Government's revised hospital plans would involve cuts. He also stated that the new hospital would have a larger capacity than the present hospital including 26 surgical theatres rather than the current 16 theatres.

In opposition to the proposed cuts, Benson-Pope filed a notice of motion urging the DCC to contribute NZ$130,400 for a public campaign to support the hospital rebuild project as it was outlined in the final business case. Benson-Pope's motion was seconded by Mayor Radich. On 31 January, the DCC voted unanimously to support Benson-Pope's motion to fight changes to the Dunedin Hospital's design. On 1 February, incoming Health Minister Ayesha Verrall confirmed that she would meet with Dunedin City councillors to discuss their concerns about the hospital rebuild changes. Dunedin electorate MP and former Health Minister Clark also rejected criticism by Councillor Carmen Houlahan that local Labour electorate MPs were not doing enough to advocate for the Dunedin hospital.

Notable people 

 Edith Statham (1853–1951) – nurse
 Colin Bouwer (born 1950) – head of psychiatry and convicted criminal
 Jim Mann (born 1944) – endocrinologist
 Edward Hulme (1812-1875), administrator

References

External links
 

Hospital buildings completed in 1851
Hospital buildings completed in 1865
Buildings and structures in Dunedin
Teaching hospitals in New Zealand
Hospitals established in 1851
1851 establishments in New Zealand